Steven Cheung (born June 23, 1982) is an American political advisor who served as White House Special Assistant to the President, Director of Strategic Response, and Assistant Communications Director in the Donald J. Trump administration. He previously worked as a senior communications advisor for Trump’s 2016 and 2020 campaigns. He was also a communications executive for the sports organization Ultimate Fighting Championship based in Las Vegas, Nevada.

Early life and education 

Cheung was born in Sacramento, California and was raised in South Sacramento. He attended California State University, Sacramento where he majored in Computer Science, Engineering, and Government.

Career

Political campaigns and UFC

Cheung began his political career in Governor Arnold Schwarzenegger’s administration in California. He later moved to Washington, DC to work on the John McCain presidential campaign. Cheung has served on the campaigns of Steve Poizner for California governor, Sharron Angle for U.S. Senate, and Texas Lt. Governor David Dewhust for U.S. Senate.
In 2013, Cheung transitioned into a career with the Ultimate Fighting Championship in Las Vegas, Nevada, where he worked as "a director of communications for public affairs at the UFC."

Trump 2016 campaign and transition 

Before then-candidate Trump was nominated as the Republican presidential nominee at the Republican National Convention in 2016, Cheung left his job at the UFC and joined the Trump campaign’s communications and press team as Director of Rapid Response. His duties included “keeping the campaign up to date on breaking news and pushing back on false or unbalanced reporting” according to a press release.

Cheung was involved in a controversial statement disavowing support from the Ku Klux Klan and a white supremacist newspaper, who endorsed Trump’s campaign. He said, “Mr. Trump and the campaign denounces hate in any form. This publication is repulsive and their views do not represent the tens of millions of Americans who are uniting behind our campaign.” This led to backlash from many of Trump’s nationalist supporters.

After Trump’s victory over Democratic candidate Hillary Clinton, Cheung was named as an advisor to the Presidential Transition team. According to media reports, he was at one point considered for the role of White House Press Secretary. That job ultimately went to Sean Spicer.

Trump White House 

Cheung was named as Special Assistant to the President and Assistant Communications Director at the White House on January 19, 2017, one day prior to Trump’s inauguration.
He was part of a team tasked with helping nominate and confirm Neil Gorsuch to the United States Supreme Court. Amid controversies about his past relating to plagiarism in his book The Future of Assisted Suicide and Euthanasia, Gorsuch was eventually confirmed to the Supreme Court by the United States Senate by a 54–45 vote.
Shortly after Gorsuch’s confirmation, Cheung was announced to a new role within the White House.

On August 16, 2017, he was appointed as Special Assistant to the President and Director of Strategic Response. He then worked on the passage of Trump’s tax reform bill, the Tax Cuts and Jobs Act of 2017. The bill successfully passed Congress and Trump signed it into law on December 22, 2017.

According to the book Sinking in the Swamp: How Trump’s Minions and Misfits Poisoned Washington, Cheung, along with three others, were referred to as “the killers” in the White House by Jared Kushner and Stephen Bannon. They were considered “innovative and action oriented”.

On June 11, 2018, Politico reported Cheung left the White House amid a contentious period in the White House with Chief of Staff John F. Kelly making changes to Trump’s White House communications staff. Amid leaks and infighting at the White House, Kelly overhauled the communications team which led to additional departures. New York Times White House journalist Maggie Haberman reported on CNN that “Cheung's name had been on several lists going back to 2017 of people who could be on the chopping block. And it has been surprising every single time. He was on the campaign. He was seen as a high performer. He was one of the hardest workers. He was involved, from the White House end, in the Gorsuch nomination coms effort, and he was involved the tax reform coms effort” and he was “one of the more respected members of [the communications] staff on the campaign.” It was later revealed that Cheung’s annual White House salary was $131,000.

Trump 2020 campaign 

Politico reported that President Trump’s 2020 re-election campaign retained the services of the firm Solgence, which is owned and operated by Cheung. As part of the 2020 campaign, Cheung worked on putting together the Republican National Convention in the midst of the Covid-19 global pandemic.

After the election where Trump was defeated by Joe Biden, Cheung was involved in the Trump campaign’s efforts to overturn the election. Despite Trump’s baseless claims, there has been no evidence of election fraud, according to experts.

Post Trump presidency 

Cheung was a senior advisor on the 2022 U.S. Senate campaign of former Missouri Governor Eric Greitens. 

It was reported in Axios that Cheung joined as senior advisor to reality star Caitlyn Jenner's gubernatorial campaign in California during the 2021 recall election. Jenner’s bid for governor was unsuccessful.

Cheung also served as an advisor and spokesperson for former congressman Jim Renacci’s 2022 campaign for Ohio governor.

Media outlets reported in 2022 that Cheung began advising cryptocurrency entrepreneur and philanthropist Brock Pierce.

Congressional campaign 

Politico reported on January 25, 2022 that Cheung was eyeing a House of Representatives seat in California’s 8th Congressional District after Rep. Jerry McNerney (D) announced his retirement.

Non-political work 

Cheung has written opinion articles for USA Today, FOX News, and the Washington Examiner.

He was inducted into the Cauliflower Alley Club as a Lifetime Member. The non-profit organization helps improves the lives of former professional wrestlers and celebrating their past achievements.

Controversies 

Cheung appeared in a contentious interview with CNN in June 2018 where critics accused him of politicizing the confirmation process of the United States Supreme Court.

He was involved in a controversial practice in Ultimate Fighting Championship of banning reporters critical of the organization from live events.

References 

1982 births
Living people
Donald Trump 2016 presidential campaign
People from Sacramento, California
California State University, Sacramento alumni
Trump administration personnel
Ultimate Fighting Championship
Songwriters from California
American politicians of Chinese descent
Donald Trump 2024 presidential campaign